Enoshima Shrine is a Shinto shrine in Enoshima, Fujisawa, Kanagawa, Japan. The shrine is dedicated to the worship of the kami Benten. Enoshima-jinja consists of three shrines, He-tsu-miya, Naka-tsu-miya and Oku-tsu-miya.

Per legend, 12th century Japanese ruler Hōjō Tokimasa visited the shrine to pray for prosperity, and there received a prophecy from a mysterious woman, who also left behind three scales, which became his family crest.

See also 
Three Great Shrines of Benzaiten
Beppyo shrines

References 

Shinto shrines in Kanagawa Prefecture
552 establishments
6th-century establishments in Japan
6th-century Shinto shrines
Shinbutsu bunri